A Long Happy Life is a 1966 Soviet melodrama film directed by Gennady Shpalikov.

Included in the 100 best Russian films according to the Russian Guild of Film Critics  (No. 92).

Plot 
The film tells about the geologist Viktor, who on his way home meets a girl named Lena, whom he falls in love with. Victor promises her a long happy life, but in reality everything does not turn out as he thought. He understands that his feelings are not as strong as at the first meeting, and she, in turn, was ready for this.

Cast 
 Inna Gulaya as Lena
 Kirill Lavrov as Viktor
 Yelizaveta Akulicheva as Barmaid  
 Pavel Luspekayev as Pavel 
 Oleg Belov as friend of Lena  
 Larisa Burkova as Firefighter's Fiancee  
 Alexey Gribov as Firs
 Liliya Gurova as Maid in a rest home  
 Natalya Zhuravel as bus conductor 
 Alla Tarasova as Ranevskaya
 Leonid Gubanov as Trofimov

References

External links 
 

1966 films
1960s Russian-language films
Soviet romantic drama films
1966 romantic drama films
Soviet teen films
1966 directorial debut films
Lenfilm films
Soviet black-and-white films